Samige Kathawa (Sam's story) is a 2014 Sri Lankan Sinhala drama film directed by Priyankara Vittanachchi and co-produced by Priyankara Vittanachchi, Wimal Deshapriya, Rohan Fonseka for Maheel Films. It stars Jagath Chamila in lead role along with Sanath Gunathilake, Nilmini Buwaneka and Menik Kurukulasuriya. Music composed by Lakshman Joseph De Saram. It is the 1202nd film in the Sri Lankan cinema. The film has based on the Gratiaen Prize winning novel Sam's Story of Captain Elmo Jayawardena.

Cast
 Jagath Chamila as Sam
 Sanath Gunathilake
 Menik Kurukulasuriya
 Kusum Perera
 Nilmini Buwaneka as Sam's mother
 Victor Ramanayake
 Vathika Ravinath
 Thesara Jayawardane as Captain Elmo's daughter

Awards
The film had many positive reviews from local and international critics and award ceremonies.

 The Best Actor award at New York City International Film Festival 2013 = Jagath Chamila.
 Special Jury Award at Fourth SAARC Film Festival.

References

2014 films
2010s Sinhala-language films
2014 drama films
Sri Lankan drama films